Mercedes-Benz 230TE may refer to one of two automobiles:

 A variant of the Mercedes-Benz W123
 A variant of the Mercedes-Benz W124

230TE